Rivière à la Chasse may refer to:

 Rivière à la Chasse (Baie-Comeau), a tributary of the Gulf of St. Lawrence in the town of Baie-Comeau, Quebec, Canada
 Rivière à la Chasse (lac Saint-Jean), a tributary of lac Saint-Jean in the Le Domaine-du-Roy Regional County Municipality, Quebec, Canada